Kathryn Celia Davis (born 1978) is an American lawyer who serves as a judge of the United States Court of Federal Claims.

Education 

Davis earned a Bachelor of Science from Boston University and a Juris Doctor, cum laude, from the Temple University Beasley School of Law.

Legal and academic career 

During 2001–2002, she was a project assistant at Jones Day. From 2003–2004, Davis was a law clerk to Judge Rayford Means of the Philadelphia County Court of Common Pleas, Criminal Trial Division. In the summer of 2004 she was a summer associate at McKissock & Hoffman and then from 2005–2007, she worked as an associate for the same firm. From 2007–2008, Davis was an associate at Burns White. From 2008–2020, Davis was a lawyer at the United States Department of Justice. She joined the United States Department of Justice Civil Division in 2008 as a trial attorney and served as senior counsel in the Federal Programs Branch from 2014–2020. Since 2018 she has been a professorial lecturer in law at the George Washington University Law School, where she teaches a course in legal research and writing.

Federal judicial service 

On October 16, 2019, President Donald Trump announced his intent to nominate Davis to serve as a judge of the United States Court of Federal Claims. On November 19, 2019, her nomination was sent to the United States Senate. President Trump nominated Davis to the seat on the United States Court of Federal Claims vacated by Judge Charles F. Lettow, who assumed senior status on July 13, 2018. On January 3, 2020, her nomination was returned to the President under Rule XXXI, Paragraph 6 of the Senate. On February 4, 2020, she was renominated to the same seat. A hearing on her nomination before the Senate Judiciary Committee was held on February 12, 2020. On May 14, 2020, her nomination was reported out of committee by a 12–10 vote. On December 2, 2020, the United States Senate invoked cloture on her nomination by a 51–44 vote. Her nomination was confirmed later that day by a 51–45 vote. She received her judicial commission on December 16, 2020. She was sworn into office on December 18, 2020.

References

External links 
 

1978 births
Living people
21st-century American women lawyers
21st-century American lawyers
21st-century American judges
21st-century American women judges
Boston University alumni
George Washington University Law School faculty
Judges of the United States Court of Federal Claims
Lawyers from Miami
Lawyers from Philadelphia
Lawyers from Washington, D.C.
Pennsylvania lawyers
Temple University Beasley School of Law alumni
United States Article I federal judges appointed by Donald Trump
United States Department of Justice lawyers